Admiral Moran may refer to:

Francis D. Moran (born 1935), NOAA Commissioned Officer Corps rear admiral
Michael T. Moran (born 1962), U.S. Navy vice admiral
William F. Moran (admiral) (born 1958), U.S. Navy admiral